Shirley Chambers (December 20, 1913 – September 11, 2011) was an American film actress of the 1930s. She was notable for playing 'dumb blonde' roles in musical comedy films. She was discovered by press agent Harry Reichenbach.

Biography 
Chambers was born in Seattle, Washington on December 20, 1913. She attended Huntington Park High School where she got into movies after winning a talent contest. She was in several films in the 1930s, but had largely retired by 1939. In 1935, Chambers married Horace D. Moulton, who was in the United States Navy.

Chambers died on September 11, 2011 in Los Angeles at the age of 97.

Filmography

References

External links
 

1913 births
2011 deaths
American film actresses
Actresses from Seattle
20th-century American actresses
21st-century American women